The Singapore Red Cross (SRC), formally the Singapore Red Cross Society, is a humanitarian aid and community services charity in Singapore. The SRC is a national member of the Federation of Red Cross and Red Crescent Societies (IFRC) and International Committee of the Red Cross (ICRC) and forms a part of the International Red Cross Movement. 

The SRC provides a range of services and programmes including international aid across the Asia-Pacific region, international humanitarian law advocacy, emergency management, blood donation and community services for the youth, families, the elderly, and persons with disabilities.

The organisation traces its history back to when it was established on 30 September 1949 as part of the British Red Cross Society's Singapore Branch. It was officially incorporated by the Parliament of Singapore on 6 April 1973 and was appointed as the National Blood Donor Recruiter by the Health Sciences Authority (HSA) in 2001.

Organisation
The SRC is governed by a 19-member Council headed by a Chairman who is appointed by the President of the Republic of Singapore, the Patron of the SRC. The Council is responsible for pursuing the objective of the SRC as laid down by the Act of Parliament and its Constitution. The Council has four oversight committees providing the relevant advice and expertise; namely the Finance and Investment, Audit, Corporate Governance and Nomination and Human Resource and Compensation Committees.

The general management of the SRC is overseen by the Management Committee, headed by the Secretary General / Chief Executive Officer (CEO) of the SRC. Implementation of the policies and directives laid down by the Council is done by the Secretariat which is headed by the Secretary General / CEO.

The Secretariat is organised into three divisions; Operations, Administration and the Red Cross Youth.

Structure 
The following are the incumbent appointment holders of the Singapore Red Cross:

Divisions 

Learning & Development
Singapore Red Cross Academy (formerly known as Red Cross Training Centre)Singapore Red Cross Youth

Blood Donor Programme
Operations & Admin
Marketing & Partnerships
Youth

Global Engagement
International Services
Centre of Excellence in Pandemic Preparedness (CoEPP)
Humanitarian Engagement

Community Engagement
Community Services
Community Resilience
Volunteer Management

Care Services
Red Cross Home for the Disabled
Day Activities Centre

Outreach
Corporate Communications
Marketing & Partnerships
Resource Development (formerly known as Fund Raising)''

Corporate Management
Human Resources
IT
Admin (FM & OM)
Compliance

Finance Management
Finance
Central Purchasing Unit
Risk Management

Work
The Singapore Red Cross was involved in the relief effort of the 2004 Indian Ocean earthquake and tsunami that occurred on 26 December 2004.

On 26 July 2018, SRC announced S$50,000 in humanitarian aid for victims of the Attapeu dam collapse.

In April 2022, Singapore Red Cross issued warning declaring Sri Lanka's medical crisis as an "unprecedented humanitarian crisis". The Government of Singapore announced that it would provide seed money amounting to USD 100,000 as a relief package to support the Singapore Red Cross's humanitarian public fundraising efforts for the most vulnerable communities in Sri Lanka.

References

Charities based in Singapore
Singaporean voluntary welfare organisations
1949 establishments in Singapore
Red Cross and Red Crescent national societies
Organizations established in 1949
Medical and health organisations based in Singapore